Lieutenant General Michael W. Wooley finished his Air Force career as Commander, Air Force Special Operations Command, Hurlburt Field, Fla. The command is a major command of the U. S. Air Force and the Air Force component of U.S. Special Operations Command. AFSOC provides Air Force Special Operations Forces for worldwide deployment and assignment to unified combatant commanders. The command has approximately 12,900 active-duty, Reserve, Air National Guard and civilian professionals.

Overview 

General Wooley received his commission from Officer Training School and is a distinguished graduate of undergraduate pilot training at Vance Air Force Base, Okla. He has commanded the 17th Military Airlift Squadron, the 375th and 86th airlift wings, the Tanker Airlift Control Center, and was Commander of the Air Force Special Operations Command. At U.S. Forces Korea, the general was responsible for formulating strategy and policy for matters pertaining to the Republic of Korea and Northeast Asia. Prior to assuming his current position, he was Commander, 3rd Air Force, Royal Air Force Mildenhall, England.

General Wooley is a command pilot with more than 4,000 flying hours.

Education 

 1972 Bachelor of Science degree in business administration, Northeast Louisiana State University
 1976 Squadron Officer School, by correspondence
 1981 Master of Science degree in business and management, Webster University
 1983 Air Command and Staff College, Maxwell AFB, Ala.
 1985 Air War College, by seminar
 1992 Industrial College of the Armed Forces, Fort Lesley J. McNair, Washington, D.C.
 1999 Executive Program for General Officers of the Russian Federation and the United States, John F. Kennedy * School of Government, Harvard University, Cambridge, Mass.
 2003 Black Sea Security Program, John F. Kennedy School of Government, Harvard University, Cambridge, Mass.

Assignments 
 1. October 1972 - September 1973, student and distinguished graduate, undergraduate pilot training, Vance AFB, Okla.
 2. October 1973 - November 1974, C-141 tanker and transport unit training, Altus AFB, Okla.; land survival training, Fairchild AFB, Wash.; and water survival training, Homestead AFB, Fla.
 3. November 1974 - May 1979, C-141A co-pilot, first pilot, aircraft commander, instructor and aide-de-camp, 20th Military Airlift Squadron, Charleston AFB, S.C.
 4. May 1979 - August 1982, readiness initiatives analyst, Headquarters Military Airlift Command, Scott AFB, Ill.
 5. August 1982 - June 1983, student, Air Command and Staff College, Maxwell AFB, Ala.
 6. June 1983 - February 1984, C-141 pilot, 41st Military Airlift Squadron, Charleston AFB, S.C.
 7. February 1984 - February 1985, C-141 assistant chief pilot and special airlift mission planner, 41st Military Airlift Squadron, Charleston AFB, S.C.
 8. February 1985 - June 1985, Chief of Current Operations and Airlift Director, 41st Military Airlift Squadron, Charleston AFB, S.C.
 9. June 1985 - August 1987, assistant operations officer, later, operations officer, 41st Military Airlift Squadron, Charleston AFB, S.C.
 10. August 1987 - July 1989, Commander, 17th Military Airlift Squadron, Charleston AFB, S.C.
 11. July 1989 - April 1990, Chief, Foreign Clearance Section, and Chief, International Treaties Section, Arms Control and International Negotiations Division, Directorate of Plans, Deputy Chief of Staff for Plans and Operations, Headquarters U.S. Air Force, Washington, D.C.
 12. April 1990 - August 1991, Secretary for Joint Chiefs of Staff and National Security Council Matters, Directorate of Plans, Deputy Chief of Staff for Plans and Operations, Headquarters U.S. Air Force, Washington, D.C.
 13. August 1991 - July 1992, student, Industrial College of the Armed Forces, Fort Lesley J. McNair, Washington, D.C.
 14. July 1992 - August 1994, Chief of Strategy and Policy, U.S. Forces Korea, Yongsan Army Garrison, Seoul, South Korea
 15. August 1994 - November 1995, Chief, Inspections Division, Office of the Inspector General, Headquarters AMC, Scott AFB, Ill.
 16. November 1995 - May 1997, Commander, 375th Airlift Wing, Scott AFB, Ill.
 17. May 1997 - July 1998, Vice Commander, Air Force Special Operations Command, Hurlburt Field, Fla.
 18. July 1998 - April 1999, Commander, 86th Airlift Wing and Kaiserslautern Military Community, Ramstein AB, Germany
 19. April 1999 - June 1999, Commander, 86th Air Expeditionary Wing and KMC, Ramstein AB, Germany
 20. June 1999 - January 2000, Commander, 86th Airlift Wing and KMC, Ramstein AB, Germany
 21. January 2000 - June 2002, Commander, Tanker Airlift Control Center, Headquarters AMC, Scott AFB, Ill.
 22. June 2002 - June 2004, Commander, 3rd Air Force, RAF Mildenhall, England
 23. July 2004 - November 2007, Commander, Air Force Special Operations Command, Hurlburt Field, Fla.

Flight Information 
Rating: Command pilot
Flight hours: More than 4,000
Aircraft flown: AC-130H, C-9A, C-21, C-130E, C-141A/B, EC-130E, MC-130E, MH-53J, MH-60G, CV-22 and U-28

Awards and decorations

Effective Dates And Promotions 
 Second Lieutenant September 20, 1972
 First Lieutenant September 20, 1974
 Captain September 20, 1976
 Major December 3, 1980
 Lieutenant Colonel March 1, 1986
 Colonel November 1, 1991
 Brigadier General September 1, 1997
 Major General October 1, 2000
 Lieutenant General August 1, 2004

(Current as of April 2008)

References

 This article includes content from Official United States Air Force Biography of Michael W. Wooley, which as a work of the U.S. Government is presumed to be a public domain resource.

United States Air Force generals
Webster University alumni
Harvard Kennedy School alumni
Living people
Recipients of the Order of the Sword (United States)
Recipients of the Legion of Merit
Recipients of the Defense Superior Service Medal
Year of birth missing (living people)